The 2022–23 season is the 118th season in the history of ADO Den Haag and their second consecutive season in the second division of Dutch football. The club are participating in the Eerste Divisie and the KNVB Cup. The season covers the period from 1 July 2022 to 30 June 2023.

Players

Out on loan

Transfers

Pre-season and friendlies

Competitions

Overall record

Eerste Divisie

League table

Results summary

Results by round

Matches 
The league fixtures were announced on 17 June 2022.

KNVB Cup

References 

ADO Den Haag
ADO Den Haag